Rock Band is a music video game released for the iOS. It was co-developed by EA Montreal and Harmonix, and was published by Electronic Arts and MTV Games.  The game was released as a part of the Rock Band series for download through the App Store in several regions on October 19, 2009.  On May 2, 2012, RockBandAide announced that EA intended to discontinue Rock Band with servers being disconnected and support being dropped on May 31, 2012. However, EA stated that the message was "sent in error" and the app would remain available to those who purchased the app. It was later announced that due to an expiring contract with Harmonix the game would be removed from the App Store. This occurred on July 31, 2012, and the game is now currently unavailable; though users who have previously downloaded the game can continue to play it.

Gameplay is similar to other Rock Band series games, but controlled without instrument controllers, and instead with the iOS-device's multi-touch display and built-in accelerometer.  The game features multiplayer support over Bluetooth, and online play via Facebook Connect.

A total of twenty songs appear in the game, and extra songs are available as purchasable, downloadable content.

Gameplay

Gameplay is similar to that of previous games in the Rock Band series, as the player has a choice to play either lead, bass guitar, drums, or vocals with up to three other players locally via an ad hoc Bluetooth network.  The game also features asynchronous multiplayer gameplay through Facebook Connect, which allows players to synchronize progress in a song with others over the internet using a cellular data connection or Wi-Fi.  Simultaneous multiplayer gameplay is not available on the original iPhone and iPod Touch devices due to technical limitations of the iPhone OS.

In place of instrument controllers as used in most other games of the series, Rock Band must be controlled using a combination of the iPhone or iPod Touch device's built-in multi-touch display and accelerometer.  While vocal gameplay has traditionally been done using a microphone in conjunction with a player literally singing words in pitch, the game uses only rhythmic touch input. During each song, each player attempts to match notes as they scroll on-screen in time with the current song. Completing consecutive series of notes will build up a player's scoring multiplier and add to the band's score for the song. Certain phrases of notes will be marked as glowing notes; successfully completing these add to the player's "Overdrive" meter.  When the Overdrive meter is at least half-full, a player can activate Overdrive to double the band's scoring multiplier.  It is activated by jolting the iOS device, whereas force feedback is produced by the device to confirm activation.  Players are rewarded with up to 5 stars for completing a song based on their scoring performance.  Three skill levels are available in Rock Band, and are known as "Easy", "Medium", and "Hard".

The game features two main single-player modes known as "Quick Play" and "World Tour". In World Tour mode, a player performs a set list in five in-game world cities: Boston, New York, Seattle, Paris and Moscow.  After completing a set list in one city, a player unlocks more songs that are playable in the next city.  In Quick Play mode, players simply access songs that have been previously unlocked in World Tour mode.

Soundtrack
There are twenty songs available by default on Rock Band. Players are able to download additional songs in the in-game "Music Store", which is available using Wi-Fi or a cellular data connection to the internet. These songs were either on previous Rock Band games or Downloadable Content.

Downloadable songs

Reception

Rock Band received mixed reviews from critics.  Common criticisms by reviewers consisted of the lack of ability to sing vocals such as in the console counterparts of the game, and the limited soundtrack out of the box. As compared to the other portable variant of the franchise Rock Band Unplugged, it was considered on par and similar in gameplay.

Sequel
Rock Band Reloaded was released for the iPhone/iPod Touch and iPad on December 2, 2010.

References

External links
MTV Games site
EA Mobile site

 

2009 video games
Drumming video games
IOS games
IOS-only games
Guitar video games
Rock Band series
Video games developed in Canada
Video games developed in the United States